No. 6 Group RCAF was a group of Royal Canadian Air Force (RCAF) heavy bomber squadrons in Europe during the Second World War, between 1942 and 1945. The group operated out of airfields in Yorkshire, England.

History
No. 6 Group was a Royal Canadian Air Force formation, differing from the previous No. 6 Group RAF.  In 1936, No. 1 (Air Defence) Group RAF, a group of auxiliary bomber squadrons formed in 1926, was renamed No. 6 (Auxiliary) Group.  No. 6 (Auxiliary) Group was renamed No. 6 (Bomber) Group on 1 January 1939.  No. 6 (Bomber) Group initially was an operational bomber group.  The first bombing attack on the naval base at Wilhelmshaven was by Nos. 107 and 110 Squadrons from No. 6 (Bomber) Group RAF with Bristol Blenheim bombers on 4 September 1939.  In the spring of 1940, that group became dedicated to controlling Bomber Command Operational Training Units providing three months training to new bomber crews and occasionally adding bombers to bomber streams. No. 6 (Bomber) Group RAF was renamed No. 91 (Bomber) Group RAF on 11 May 1942 and the 6 Group designation was transferred to the RCAF on 25 October 1942.

No. 6 Group RCAF was made up of Article XV squadrons: RCAF units formed under the British Commonwealth Air Training Plan, for service with British operational formations; hence No. 6 Group was part of Royal Air Force (RAF) Bomber Command. However, a significant number of personnel from the RAF, Royal Australian Air Force (RAAF), Royal New Zealand Air Force (RNZAF) and other Allied air forces were attached to 6 Group during the war.

Formation
Significant operations involving 6 Group included raids on U-boat bases in Lorient and Saint-Nazaire, France and night bombing raids on industrial complexes and urban centres in Germany.
The RCAF began participating in operations by RAF Bomber Command in 1941, but its squadrons were initially attached to RAF groups. In addition, many individual RCAF personnel belonged to RAF aircrews, in RAF squadrons. The Canadian government wanted RCAF bomber squadrons and personnel to be concentrated, as much as possible, in a distinct, identifiably Canadian group. To this end, 6 (RCAF) Group was formed on 25 October 1942 with eight squadrons.

At the peak of its strength, 6 Group consisted of 14 squadrons. Fifteen squadrons would eventually serve with the group, which was almost every RCAF heavy bomber squadron. Headquarters for 6 Group was at Allerton Park near Knaresborough and Harrogate in North Yorkshire.

Operations

No. 6 Group flew 40,822 operational sorties. A total of 814 aircraft and approximately 5,700 airmen did not return from operations and 4,203  airmen lost their lives.

Stations

No. 6 Group was mainly formed from 4 Group, which was based primarily in Yorkshire. Once split, most of 6 Group`s airfields were north of York and most of 4 Group`s were south and east of the city. Like most other groups within RAF Bomber Command, the "base" system was used for station organization.

Four bases comprising 11 stations made up No. 6 Group. A base consisted of a main station, or headquarters, and a number of sub-stations. Late in 1943, Bomber Command bases were designated with a two-number identifier.  The first number represented the group number, and the second number represented the base within that group.  The first base within the group was the group's training base.  No. 61 Base was therefore the training base for No. 6 Group.  Each base was commanded by an air commodore, and each station was commanded by a group captain.

Commanders
No. 6 Group's commanders were:
25 October 1942 to 28 February 1944 Air Vice-Marshal George Brookes with headquarters at Allerton Park, Yorkshire, England
29 February 1944 to 13 July 1945 Air Vice-Marshal Clifford McEwen with headquarters at Allerton Park, Yorkshire, England
14 July to 1 September 1945 Air Commodore John Kerr at Main Headquarters at Halifax, Nova Scotia
14 July 45 to 1 September 1945 Air Commodore J L Hurley at Rear Headquarters, Allerton Park

Operational squadrons

 No. 405 Squadron RCAF
 No. 408 Squadron RCAF
 No. 415 Squadron RCAF
 No. 419 Squadron RCAF
 No. 420 (Snowy Owl) Squadron RCAF
 No. 424 Squadron RCAF
 No. 425 Squadron RCAF
 No. 426 Squadron RCAF
 No. 427 Squadron RCAF
 No. 428 (Ghost) Squadron RCAF
 No. 429 Squadron RCAF
 No. 431 Squadron RCAF
 No. 432 (Leaside) Squadron RCAF
 No. 433 Squadron RCAF
 No. 434 Squadron RCAF

See also
 List of Royal Air Force groups

References

Notes

Bibliography

 
  139

External links
 6 Group Bomber Command
 No. 6 Group History
 RCAF Bomber Crews and Their Experiences

Units and formations of the Royal Canadian Air Force
006 Group
Air force units and formations of Canada in World War II
1942 establishments in England